Mzimvubu to Keiskamma WMA, or Mzimvubu to Keiskamma Water Management Area (coded: 12), includes the following major rivers: the Swane River, Mntafufu River, Mzimvubu River, Mngazi River, Mthatha River, Xora River, Mbashe River, Nqabara River, Gqunube River, Buffalo River, Nahoon River, Groot Kei River and Keiskamma River, and covers the following Dams:

 Binfield Park Dam on Tyhume River  
 Bridle Drift Dam on Buffalo River 
 Doornrivier Dam on Doorn River 
 Gcuwa Dam on Gcuwa River 
 Gubu Dam on Gubu River 
 Laing Dam on Buffalo River 
 Lubisi Dam on Indwe River 
 Nahoon Dam on Nahoon River 
 Ncora Dam on Tsomo River 
 Oxkraal Dam on Oxkraal River 
 Rooikrantz Dam on Buffalo River 
 Sandile Dam on Keiskamma River 
 Mthatha Dam on Mthatha River 
 Waterdown Dam on Klipplaat River 
 Wriggleswade Dam on Kubisi River 
 Xilinxa Dam on Xilinxa River 
 Xonxa Dam on White Kei River

Boundaries 
Primary drainage regions R and S, and also tertiary drainage regions T11 to T13, T20, T31 to T36, T60, T70, T80 and T90.

See also 
 Water Management Areas
 List of reservoirs and dams in South Africa
 List of rivers of South Africa

References

External links
 Hydrology
Is there a role for traditional governance systems in South Africa's new water management regime? 

Water Management Areas
Dams in South Africa